Erling Wikborg (5 November 1894 – 6 April 1992) was a Norwegian politician for the Christian Democratic Party.

He was elected to the Norwegian Parliament from Akershus in 1945, and was re-elected from Oslo on two occasions.

Wikborg held a number of other prominent posts. He was the second leader of the Christian Democratic Party from 1951 to 1955, and a member of the Norwegian Nobel Committee in 1965 and from 1967 to 1970. From August to September 1963 he was Minister of Foreign Affairs during the short-lived centre-right Cabinet of John Lyng.

A lawyer by profession, he was born in Drammen, graduated with a cand.jur. degree in 1918, and studied international law in France and England in 1922 and 1923. Wikborg died on 6 April 1992 at the age of 97.

References

1894 births
1992 deaths
Members of the Storting
Foreign Ministers of Norway
Christian Democratic Party (Norway) politicians
Politicians from Oslo
Politicians from Drammen
20th-century Norwegian lawyers
20th-century Norwegian politicians